Hypena palparia, the variegated snout-moth or mottled bomolocha, is a moth of the family Erebidae. The species was first described by Francis Walker in 1861.

The wingspan is 27–33 mm. The moth flies from June to July depending on the location. There are at least two generations over much of east.

The larvae feed on the leaves of Ostrya virginiana and Corylus species.

References

palparia
Moths of North America
Moths described in 1861